The Women's 400 metres hurdles at the 2014 Commonwealth Games, as part of the athletics programme, took place at Hampden Park between 29 and 31 July 2014.

Results

Preliminaries

Heat 1

Heat 2

Heat 3

Final

References

Women's 400 metres hurdles
2014
2014 in women's athletics